An exit strategy is a means of leaving one's current situation.

Exit Strategy or Exit Plan may also refer to:

 "Exit Strategy" (Arrested Development episode), an episode in the third season of the TV series Arrested Development
 Exit Strategy (album), an album by Australian hip hop group Astronomy Class
 "Exit Strategy" (Charmed), an episode of the television series Charmed
 Exit Strategy (film), a 2012 American romantic comedy film directed by Michael Whitton
 Exit Strategy, a 2007 novel by Kelley Armstrong
 "eXit strategy", an episode of the television series The Gifted
 Exit planning, the preparation for the exit of an entrepreneur from his company
 Exit Plan (film), a 2020 mystery drama film
 Escape Plan (film), a 2013 American film formerly known as Exit Plan
"Exit Strategy, the fifteenth chapter in the first novel of the Tara Duncan book series Tara Duncan and the Spellbinders.